Education in the Cayman Islands is compulsory for those aged 4 to 16 and is free to all Caymanian children. The literacy rate for residents over age 15 is 98%. Public schools follow a British-style educational system. The Cayman Islands Education Department operates 10 primary, one special education, and three high schools. In addition, there is a university and a school of law. There are also numerous private schools.

Schools

Further education
Cayman Islands Further Education Centre

Universities

Public Universities
University College of the Cayman Islands
Truman Bodden Law School (affiliated with the University of Liverpool)

Private Universities
International College of the Cayman Islands
St Matthew's University

Research Institutions
Central Caribbean Marine Institute

References

 
Society of the Cayman Islands